Marc Justine Alvarez (born March 18, 2005) is a Filipino former child actor.

Personal life and acting career 
Marc Justine graduated elementary in April 2017 from Laong Laan Elementary School.

Filmography

References 
 Child Wonder Marc Justine Alvarez Retrieved 2017-06-09
 'Transit'  child actor Marc Justine Alvarez nag-aral pa ng Hebrew Retrieved 2017-06-09
 Child actor Marc Justine Alvarez openly admires Jillian Ward Retrieved 2017-06-09
 Cinemalaya winner 'Transit' chosen for 2014 Oscars Retrieved 2017-06-09

External links 

2005 births
Filipino male child actors
GMA Network personalities
Tagalog people
Living people